Robert Emmet Sherwood (April 4, 1896 – November 14, 1955) was an American playwright and screenwriter.

He is the author of Waterloo Bridge, Idiot's Delight, Abe Lincoln in Illinois, Rebecca, There Shall Be No Night, The Best Years of Our Lives and The Bishop's Wife.

He received Pulitzer Prize for Drama , Academy Award for Best Screenplay (1947) and Pulitzer Prize for Biography (1948) awards.

Early life and family

Born in 1896 in New Rochelle, New York, Robert was a son of Arthur Murray Sherwood, a rich stockbroker, and his wife, the former Rosina Emmet, a highly accomplished illustrator and portrait painter known as Rosina E. Sherwood. His paternal grandmother,  Mary Elizabeth Wilson Sherwood, was an author and social leader. He was a great-great-grandson of the former New York State Attorney General Thomas Addis Emmet and a great-grandnephew of the Irish nationalist Robert Emmet, who was executed for high treason after leading the Irish rebellion of 1803, one of a series of attempts to dislodge British rule in Ireland, in 1803. His relatives also included three other notable American portrait artists: his aunts, Lydia Field Emmet and Jane Emmet de Glehn, and his first cousin, once removed, Ellen Emmet Rand.
Sherwood was educated at Fay School, Milton Academy and then Harvard University.

He fought with the Royal Highlanders of Canada, CEF in Europe during World War I and was wounded. After his return to the United States, he began working as a movie critic for magazines, including Life and Vanity Fair. Sherwood's career as a critic in the 1920s is discussed in the 2009 documentary For the Love of Movies: The Story of American Film Criticism. In this film Time critic Richard Schickel discusses, among other topics, how Sherwood was the first New York critic invited to Hollywood by cross-country train to meet the stars and directors.

Writing career
Sherwood was one of the original members of the Algonquin Round Table. He was close friends with Dorothy Parker and Robert Benchley, who were on the staff of Vanity Fair with Sherwood when the Round Table began meeting in 1919. Author Edna Ferber was also a good friend. When asked at a party how long he had known Sherwood, Benchley stood on a chair, raised his hand to the ceiling, and said "I knew Bob Sherwood back when he was only this tall."

In 1949, comedian Groucho Marx also commented about Sherwood's height during a filmed radio broadcast of the quiz show You Bet Your Life.  Groucho, who hosted the popular series, interviewed in one episode American football player Howard Scala, a member of the NFL's Green Bay Packers.  Impressed by Scala's own considerable height, Marx shared the following anecdote with the show's audience:

Sherwood's first Broadway play, The Road to Rome (1927), a comedy concerning Hannibal's botched invasion of Rome, introduced one of his favorite themes: the futility of war. Many of his later dramatic works employed variations of this theme, including Idiot's Delight (1936), which won Sherwood the first of four Pulitzer Prizes. According to legend, he once admitted to the gossip columnist Lucius Beebe: “The trouble with me is that I start with a big message and end up with nothing but good entertainment.”

Sherwood was actively engaged with the advocacy for writers' rights within the theatre world. From 1937 to 1939, Sherwood served as the seventh president of the Dramatists Guild of America.

Sherwood's Broadway success soon attracted the attention of Hollywood; he began writing for movies in 1926. While some of his work went uncredited, his films included many adaptations of his plays. He also collaborated with Alfred Hitchcock and Joan Harrison in writing the screenplay for Rebecca (1940).

With Europe in the midst of World War II, Sherwood set aside his anti-war stance to support the fight against the Third Reich. There Shall Be No Night, his 1940 play about the Soviet Union's invasion of Finland, was produced by the Playwright's Company that he co-founded, and it starred Alfred Lunt, Lynn Fontanne, and Montgomery Clift. Katharine Cornell produced and starred in a 1957 TV adaptation on TV. Sherwood publicly ridiculed isolationist Charles Lindbergh as a "Nazi with a Nazi's Olympian contempt for all democratic processes".

During this period Sherwood also served as a speechwriter for President Franklin D. Roosevelt. He recounted the experience in his book Roosevelt and Hopkins: An Intimate History, which won the 1949 Pulitzer Prize for Biography or Autobiography and a 1949 Bancroft Prize. Sherwood is credited with originating the phrase that eventually evolved to "arsenal of democracy", a frequent catchphrase in Roosevelt's wartime speeches. Sherwood was quoted on May 12, 1940 by The New York Times" "This country is already, in effect, an arsenal for the democratic Allies."

After serving as director of the Overseas Branch of the Office of War Information from 1943 until the conclusion of the war, he returned to dramatic writing with the movie The Best Years of Our Lives, directed by William Wyler. The 1946 film, which explores changes in the lives of three soldiers after they return home from war, earned Sherwood an Academy Award for Best Screenplay.

Death and legacy
Sherwood died of a heart attack in New York City in 1955. A production of Small War on Murray Hill, his final work, debuted on Broadway at the Ethel Barrymore Theatre on January 3, 1957.

Sherwood was portrayed by actor Nick Cassavetes in Mrs. Parker and the Vicious Circle, a 1994 movie about the Algonquin Round Table.

Plays
 The Road to Rome (1927)
 The Love Nest (1927)
 The Queen's Husband (1928), adapted into the 1931 film The Royal Bed
 Waterloo Bridge (1930), adapted into two American films and two Brazilian soap-operas 
 This Is New York (1930), adapted into the 1932 film Two Kinds of Women
 Reunion in Vienna (1931), adapted into a 1933 film
 Acropolis (1933)
 The Petrified Forest (1935), adapted into 1936 film with Leslie Howard, Bette Davis, and Humphrey Bogart
 Tovarich (1935), from a French comedy by Jacques Deval, adapted into a 1937 film and a 1963 musical with Vivien Leigh and Jean Pierre Aumont
 Idiot's Delight (1936), Pulitzer Prize for Drama, adapted into 1939 film
 Abe Lincoln in Illinois (1938), Pulitzer Prize for Drama, adapted into a 1940 film
 There Shall Be No Night (1940), Pulitzer Prize for Drama
 The Rugged Path (1945), starring Spencer Tracy
 Miss Liberty (1949), book for Irving Berlin musical 
 Small War on Murray Hill (1957), produced posthumously

Nonfiction
  1949 Pulitzer Prize (Biography)

References

External links
 Robert E. Sherwood papers, 1917-1968. Houghton Library, Harvard University
 
 
 
 

1896 births
1955 deaths
Emmet family
Milton Academy alumni
Pulitzer Prize for Drama winners
Pulitzer Prize for Biography or Autobiography winners
Bancroft Prize winners
20th-century American dramatists and playwrights
Writers from New Rochelle, New York
The Harvard Lampoon alumni
Writers from New York (state)
American film critics
Best Adapted Screenplay Academy Award winners
Journalists from New York (state)
Fay School alumni
20th-century American non-fiction writers
People of the United States Office of War Information
20th-century American journalists
American male journalists
Algonquin Round Table
20th-century screenwriters